Inga multinervis is a species of plant in the family Fabaceae. It is found only in Ecuador. Its natural habitats are subtropical or tropical moist lowland forests and subtropical or tropical moist montane forests.

References

multinervis
Flora of Ecuador
Least concern plants
Taxonomy articles created by Polbot